Eduard Heinrich Flottwell (23 July 1786 – 28 May 1865; after 1861 von Flottwell) was a Prussian Staatsminister. He served as Oberpräsident (governor) of the Grand Duchy of Posen (from 1830) and of the Saxony (from 1841), Westphalia (from 1846) and Brandenburg (from 1850) Provinces. He was also Prussian Minister of Finance (1844-1846) and Minister of Interior (1858-1859).

Flottwell was born in Insterburg in the Province of East Prussia (present-day Chernyakhovsk in Russian Kaliningrad Oblast), studied law at the University of Königsberg and entered the civil service at the Insterburg court in 1805; from 1812 he was a member of the East Prussian Regierungspräsidium of Gumbinnen. After the Napoleonic Wars he together with Oberpräsident Theodor von Schön re-organised the administration of the West Prussian province at Danzig. In 1825 he was appointed Regierungspräsident of Marienwerder.

When in 1830 the Polish November Uprising led by Michał Gedeon Radziwiłł broke out at Warsaw in Russian Congress Poland, his brother Antoni Radziwiłł was dismissed as Duke-Governor of the Prussian Grand Duchy of Posen by King Frederick William III and the sole rule passed to Flottwell as the new Oberpräsident. He was a strong supporter of Germanisation and standardised schooling policies, which by some was seen as directed against ethnic Polish Prussians in the region. In 1843 in "Anerkennung der Hilfe nach dem großen Hamburger Brand" (acknowledgment of the assistance after the great Hamburg fire), he was named an honorary citizen of Hamburg.

References

 F.Paprocki, Wielkie Księstwo Poznańskie w okresie rządów Flottwella (1830-1842), Poznań 1970 
 Witold Jakóbczyk, Przetrwać na Wartą 1815-1914, Dzieje narodu i państwa polskiego, vol. III-55, Krajowa Agencja Wydawnicza, Warszawa 1989

1786 births
1865 deaths
German untitled nobility
Members of the Frankfurt Parliament
Prussian politicians
People from East Prussia
People from Insterburg
People from the Grand Duchy of Posen
University of Königsberg alumni
Finance ministers of Prussia
People from Kwidzyn
Provincial Presidents of Posen
Provincial Presidents of Westphalia
Provincial Presidents of Saxony